Halvor Thorbjørn Hjertvik (17 June 1914 - 7 November 1995) was a Norwegian politician for the Christian Democratic Party.

He served as a deputy representative to the Norwegian Parliament from Rogaland during the terms 1958–1961 and 1961–1965.

References

1914 births
1995 deaths
Christian Democratic Party (Norway) politicians
Deputy members of the Storting
Rogaland politicians